White flannel moth is a common name for several insects and may refer to:

Megalopyge crispata, found in the United States
Norape ovina, found in the Americas

Insect common names